Alan J. Flusser (born 16 May 1945) is an American author and designer of men's clothing.  He owns and operates Alan Flusser Custom in New York City.

Early life and education
Flusser was born in West Orange, New Jersey.  In 1979 he founded Alan Flusser Designs.   He is a graduate of the University of Pennsylvania.

Career
In 1985 he launched Alan Flusser Custom which focuses on custom and made-to-measure suits.

Flusser designed the wardrobe for Gordon Gekko (played by Michael Douglas) in Wall Street and designed clothing for the films  Barbarians at the Gate, Scent of a Woman, and American Psycho (film) starring Christian Bale as Patrick Bateman.

Influence
Flusser had huge influence on popular culture through movies that today have cult following, most notably Wall Street and American Psycho. He played a major role in promotion of style inspired by 1930s, which is today accepted as a golden age of men’s fashion. In his own words:

Bibliography

Awards and honors 
Flusser won the 1983 Coty Award as Top Menswear Designer, and received the Cutty Sark Award in 1987.

References

External links
Official site
FashionEncyclopedia.com profile

1945 births
Living people
American fashion designers
People from West Orange, New Jersey
Writers from New Jersey
Menswear designers
University of Pennsylvania alumni